Calderstones School is an English comprehensive school located opposite Calderstones Park on Harthill Road in the Liverpool suburb of Allerton.

The school was founded in 1921 as Quarry Bank High School for Boys and its first intake of 225 pupils was on 11 January 1922. The first headmaster of the school was R. F. Bailey (an old Etonian), who formed the school on the principles of public school houses. Subsequently, the first year boys' house was named Bailey. The current headteacher is Lee Ratcliffe.

The school has several notable former pupils, including founding Beatles member John Lennon, music producer Guy Chambers and the architect Sir James Stirling.

History
In September 1967, Quarry Bank High School for Boys merged with neighbouring Calder High School for Girls (a girls' grammar school, also on Harthill Road) and nearby Morrison Boys' Secondary Modern, and adopted the name Quarry Bank Comprehensive School. The same year saw the abolition of the school's house system, whereby the pupils were divided between Mersey, Esmeduna, Wavertree, Sefton, Allerton, Childwall, Aigburth and Woolton houses.

In 1985, the school merged with Aigburth Vale High School, Aigburth, which led to the school operating at four sites with 1,800 pupils; it was also then that it adopted its current name. Aigburth Vale was previously a grammar school with around 600 girls. In 1989, the school divested itself of its Aigburth and Morrison facilities, retaining only the original Calder House and Quarry Bank estates. A new building to replace the Morrison wing was built within the existing school site. The former Morrison site is now home to a Tesco superstore on Mather Avenue in Allerton. The site of Aigburth Vale High School was redeveloped as flats.

Refurbishment
In 2001, the school underwent a major refurbishment as part of a Private Finance Initiative scheme. The entire site was overhauled, with the old Calder Wing largely demolished, leaving only Calder House which now houses the sixth form. A new Arts Wing was built to house the English, MFL, Arts and Music departments. The former Quarry Wing was divided into two separate buildings. One is Quarry House which houses the ICT and History departments, and the main office for the school. The main classroom core of the Quarry Wing is now known as the Science Wing and houses a large number of science labs. The school was awarded 'Specialist Science Status' in 2001, which allows it to provide first class science facilities for its pupils.

Notable former pupils

Quarry Bank High School for Boys
Prof. John Ashton, Director of Public Health
Rt. Rev. Jonathan Bailey, Bishop of Derby from 1995 to 2005
Clive Barker, film writer, director and producer (Hellraiser, Candyman), books (Weaveworld, The Hellbound Heart), comic books (Razorline, Tapping the Vein) and video games (Clive Barker's Undying, Clive Barker's Jericho)
Brian Barwick, chief executive of the Football Association from 2005 to 2008
David Basnett, trade union leader
Michael Batty CBE FRS FBA, Bartlett Professor of Planning at University College London
Stephen Bayley, architecture writer and Chief executive of the Design Museum from 1986 to 1989
Prof. Edmund (Ted) Bellamy, Professor of Physics at Westfield College, London from 1960 to 1984
Doug Bradley, actor, who played the 'Pinhead' character in Hellraiser
Peter Cheeseman, theatre director, pioneer of theatre-in-the-round and documentary drama
Steve Coppell, footballer and football manager
Les Dennis, comedian and TV personality
Prof. Alan Deyermond, Professor of Spanish at Queen Mary and Westfield College, London from 1969 to 1997
Peter Goldsmith (Lord Goldsmith of Allerton), who was appointed as the Labour government's Attorney General in 2001
John Lennon, rock musician, singer/songwriter, author and peace activist, and one of the founding members of The Beatles (Lennon named his first band The Quarrymen, after the school's original name)
The Ven. John Lewis (Archdeacon of North-West Europe)
Derek Nimmo, actor
Joe Royle, footballer and football manager
Labour cabinet ministers Peter Shore and Bill Rodgers, who adopted the name "Quarry Bank" as part of his baronial title 
Leo Skeete, footballer in the 1970s and 1980s
Sir James Stirling, architect

Calder High School for Girls
Margaret Ursula Jones, archaeologist
Judith Kelly OBE, artistic director of London's Southbank Centre
Dr. Diana Walford CBE, haematologist and Principal of Mansfield College, Oxford since 2002

Aigburth Vale High School for Girls
Kate Ellis, crime fiction author
Bel Mooney (briefly), journalist
Elisabeth Sladen, actress (Doctor Who, The Sarah Jane Adventures)

Quarry Bank Comprehensive School
Susan Bickley, mezzo-soprano and opera singer
Guy Chambers (Sixth Form), songwriter
Andy Merrifield, urban theorist
John Power, former member of the band the La's and founding member of Cast

Calderstones Community Comprehensive School
Marcus Holden, international rugby player, Cyprus Rugby National Team
Geoff Rowley, skateboarder, co-owner of Flip Skateboards
"Zombina" and "Doc Horror", musicians in Zombina and the Skeletones

References

External links

 

Secondary schools in Liverpool
Educational institutions established in 1921
1921 establishments in England
Community schools in Liverpool